Sam Durdin (born 	6 June 1996) is a professional Australian rules footballer playing for the Carlton Football Club in the Australian Football League (AFL).

Durdin was originally drafted by North Melbourne in the Australian Football League (AFL) with their first selection and sixteenth overall in the 2014 national draft. He made his debut in the forty-two point loss against  at Blundstone Arena in round three of the 2017 season. 

Following his delisting he signed for the Glenelg Football Club in the South Australian National Football League.

Durdin was selected by the Carlton Football Club with their first selection in the 2022 mid season draft.

References

External links

1996 births
Living people
North Melbourne Football Club players
Carlton Football Club players
West Adelaide Football Club players
Australian rules footballers from South Australia